There's Room Up Ahead (Italian: Avanti c'è posto) is a 1942 Italian comedy film directed by Mario Bonnard and starring Aldo Fabrizi, Andrea Checchi and Adriana Benetti. It was made at Cinecittà in Rome.

Plot 
A young girl - Rosella - loses her wallet on a tram. Cesare, the ticket collector, is trying to help her after she's left without a dime and homeless. Soon he and his tram driver friend Bruno are competing for the attention of the girl.

Cast
 Aldo Fabrizi as Cesare Montani  
 Andrea Checchi as Bruno Bellini 
 Adriana Benetti as Rosella  
 Virgilio Riento as The Boss
 Carlo Micheluzzi as Angelo Pandolin  
 Cesira Vianello as Cecilia Pandolin  
 Jone Morino as The woman who vanished
 Pina Gallini as The misstres of Rosella
 Gioconda Stari as Teresa 
 Arturo Bragaglia as Tullio 
 Giulio Battiferri as Pietro, tram driver
 Giulio Calì as A passenger
 Wanda Capodaglio as Mrs. Camilla
 Olga Capri 
 Giuseppe Ciabattini 
 Enrico Luzi as A passenger
 Vinicio Sofia as The hotel porter
 Anna Maria Zuti

References

Bibliography 
 Moliterno, Gino. A to Z of Italian Cinema. Scarecrow Press, 2009.
 Reich, Jacqueline & Garofalo, Piero. Re-viewing Fascism: Italian Cinema, 1922-1943. Indiana University Press, 2002.

External links 

1942 films
Italian comedy films
1942 comedy films
1940s Italian-language films
Films directed by Mario Bonnard
Films with screenplays by Cesare Zavattini
Films with screenplays by Federico Fellini
Italian black-and-white films
Films shot at Cinecittà Studios
1940s Italian films